Carrillo is a surname.

The House of Carrillo was a large Spanish noble house that traces its origins from the ancient Kingdom of Castille.

Other notable people with the surname include:

 Álvaro Carrillo (1921–1969), Mexican music composer
 Amado Carrillo Fuentes (1956–1997), Mexican drug lord
 André Carrillo (born 1991), Peruvian footballer
 Aníbal Carrillo, Paraguayan politician
 Carlos Antonio Carrillo (1783–1852), Governor of Alta California
 Cesar Carrillo (born 1984), American baseball player
 Charles M. Carrillo (born 1956), American artist
 Donovan Carrillo (born 1999), Mexican figure skater
 Edna Carrillo (born 1991), Mexican judoka
 Elpidia Carrillo (born 1961), Mexican actress
 Enrique Gómez Carrillo (1873–1927), Guatemalan writer
 Ernesto Perez-Carrillo (born 1952), Cuban master cigar maker
 Erwin Carrillo (born 1983), Colombian footballer
 Fernando Carrillo (b. 1966), Venezuelan actor
 Fernando Carrillo Flórez (born 1963), Colombian politician
 Gil Álvarez Carrillo de Albornoz (1310–1367), Spanish cardinal and ecclesiastical leader
 Guido Carrillo (born 1991), Argentinian football player
 Humberto Carrillo (born 1995), Mexican professional wrestler
 Joan Carrillo (born 1968), Spanish footballer and manager
 José Ángel Carrillo (born 1994), Spanish footballer
 José Antonio Carrillo (1796–1862), the three-time mayor of pre-statehood Los Angeles
 José Raimundo Carrillo (1749–1809), member of 1769 Portolà expedition
 Juan José Carrillo (1842–1916), the mayor of Santa Monica and Santa Barbara, California
 Julián Carrillo (1875–1965), Mexican composer and musical theorist
 Laiza Carrillo (born 1968), Cuban long and triple jumper
 Leo Carrillo (1880–1961), American actor
 Lluís Carrillo (born 1971), Spanish football manager
 Luis Carrillo (died 1568), Spanish colonial administrator
 Mario Carrillo (born 1956), a Mexican football coach
 Mónica Carrillo (born 1976), Spanish journalist and novelist
 Nabor Carrillo Flores (1911–1967), Mexican nuclear physicist
 Pablo San Segundo Carrillo (born 1970), Spanish chess grandmaster
 Ramón Carrillo (1906–1956), Argentine neurosurgeon, neurobiologist
 Rod Carrillo, Panamanian-American music producer
 Roxanna Carrillo, Peruvian feminist and activist
 Santiago Carrillo (1915–2012), Spanish communist leader
 Tony Carrillo (politician) (1936–2020), American politician
 Vicente Carrillo Fuentes (born 1962), Mexican drug lord, brother of Amado Carrillo Fuentes
 Vicente Carrillo Leyva (born 1976), Mexican drug lord, son of Amado Carrillo Fuentes
 Yadhira Carrillo (born 1972), Mexican actress

See also
 Carillo, surname

Spanish-language surnames